Asakusa (浅草) is a district in Tokyo, Japan.

Asakusa may also refer to
Asakusa Station
Asakusa International Theater in Asakusa, Tokyo
Asakusa Mosque in central Tokyo
Asakusa Shrine in Asakusa, Tokyo
Toei Asakusa Line, a subway line in Tokyo
The Scarlet Gang of Asakusa, a novel by Yasunari Kawabata